The 2018–19 season is Bradford City's 116th season in their history, their 104th in the English Football League and 106th in the English football league system.

Pre-season
On 18 May 2018, Bradford City announced two friendly games against Farsley Celtic and Sheffield United. Three days later, they revealed further matches with Guiseley and local derby against Bradford Park Avenue. On 23 May 2018, a further date away at York City was added to the preseason schedule followed by an away date against Harrogate Town announced on 11 June. On 22 June 2018, a further away date against Carlisle United was announced.

Competitions

League One

League table

Result summary

Matches
On 21 June 2018, the League One fixtures for the forthcoming season were announced.

FA Cup

The first round draw was made live on BBC by Dennis Wise and Dion Dublin on 22 October. The draw for the second round was made live on BBC and BT by Mark Schwarzer and Glenn Murray on 12 November.

EFL Cup

On 15 June 2018, the draw for the first round was made in Vietnam.

EFL Trophy
On 13 July 2018, the initial group stage draw bar the U21 invited clubs was announced.

Squad Statistics

Statistics accurate as of 4 May 2019

Transfers

Transfers in

Transfers out

Loans in

Loans out

References

Bradford City A.F.C. seasons
Bradford City